Živinbudas was one of the five senior Lithuanian dukes mentioned in the treaty with Halych-Volhynia in 1219. The treaty lists a total of 21 dukes, five of them being elder or superior. Since Živinbudas is mentioned first in the list, it is presumed that he was the supreme ruler of Lithuania. He is not mentioned in any other sources and the mention in the treaty is the only bit of information available about him. However, some historians argue he was ancestor of Traidenis, Grand Duke of Lithuania ca. 1270-1282. That is probably influence of the Palemonids legends popularized by fake 16th century genealogies that connected a mythical Palemon, a prince of Venice who settled in Lithuania in the 10th century, to the Gediminids, an established dynasty.

The Russian Gustinskaya Chronicle mentions Živibundas under the year 1218.

References

13th-century deaths
Year of birth unknown
Place of birth unknown
Year of death unknown
Place of death unknown
13th-century Lithuanian nobility